, also credited as Sakae Ozawa (小沢栄), was a Japanese actor. He appeared in more than 200 films between 1935 and 1988, directed by notable filmmakers such as Kenji Mizoguchi, Mikio Naruse, Keisuke Kinoshita and Kaneto Shindō.

Selected filmography

Films

 Lady from Hell (1949) as Fujimura
 Lightning (1952)
 Ugetsu (1953)
 The Crucified Lovers (1954)
 Princess Yang Kwei-Fei (1955)
 Wolf (1955)
 A Girl Isn't Allowed to Love (1955)
 An Actress (1956)
 Suzakumon (1957)
 The H-Man (1958)
 The Loyal 47 Ronin (1958)
 Tsukihime keizu (1958)
 Ballad of the Cart (1959)
 Lucky Dragon No. 5 (1959)
 When a Woman Ascends the Stairs (1960)
 Scar Yosaburo (1960)
 Go to Hell, Hoodlums! (1960)
 The Demon of Mount Oe (1960)
 Kurenai no Kenju (1961)
 The Mad Fox (1962)
 Gorath (1962)
 Assassination (1964)
 Our Blood Will Not Forgive (1964)
 Akuto (1965)
 Shiroi Kyotō (1966), Professor Ugai
 Zatoichi Challenged (1967)
 Black Rose Mansion (1969)
 Long Journey into Love (1973)
 Sandakan No. 8 (1974)
 Kenji Mizoguchi: The Life of a Film Director (1975)
 New Battles Without Honor and Humanity: Last Days of the Boss (1976)
  Shōsetsu Yoshida gakkō (1983), Tsuruhei Matsuno
 Imperial Navy (1981), Osami Nagano
 Shinran: Path to Purity (1987)
 A Taxing Woman (1987)

Television
 Shin Heike Monogatari (1972), Shinzei
 Genroku Taiheiki (1975), Kira Yoshinaka
 Castle of Sand (1977)
 Shiroi Kyotō (1978), Professor Ugai
 Hissatsu Karakurinin Fugakuhiyakkei Koroshitabi (1978)
 Akō Rōshi (1979), Kira Yoshinaka
 Shadow Warriors III (1982), Tokugawa Mitsusada
 Ōoku (1983), Tokugawa Mitsukuni

Honours
 Order of the Rising Sun, 4th Class, Gold Rays with Rosette (1988)

References

External links
 

1909 births
1988 deaths
Japanese male film actors
Male actors from Tokyo
20th-century Japanese male actors
Recipients of the Order of the Rising Sun, 4th class